|}

The Lowther Stakes is a Group 2 flat horse race in Great Britain open to two-year-old fillies. It is run at York over a distance of 6 furlongs (1,207 metres), and it is scheduled to take place each year in August.

History
A different event called the Lowther Stakes, a middle-distance race open to horses aged three or older, used to be contested at Newmarket. Its winners included Bay Ronald (1896), Bayardo (1909) and Gay Crusader (1917).

The present version is named in memory of Hugh Lowther (1857–1944), the 5th Earl of Lonsdale. It was established in 1946, and the inaugural running was won by Southernwood.

The Lowther Stakes is currently held on the second day of York's four-day Ebor Festival meeting. The leading horses from the race sometimes go on to compete in the Cheveley Park Stakes and the most recent filly to win both races was Fairyland in 2018.

Records
Leading jockey (3 wins):
 Harry Carr – Woodflower (1947), Gamble in Gold (1950), Dunce Cap (1962)
 Ron Hutchinson – Kathy Too (1960), La Tendresse (1961), Sovereign (1967)
 Lester Piggott – Kittyhawk (1980), Prickle (1983), Niche (1992)
 Richard Hughes - Best Terms (2011), Rosdhu Queen (2012), Tiggy Wiggy (2014)

Leading trainer (5 wins):
 Richard Hannon Sr. – Enstone Spark (1977), Only Yours (1990), Niche (1992), Infamous Angel (2008), Best Terms (2011)

Winners since 1960

Earlier winners

 1946: Southernwood
 1947: Woodflower
 1948: Shard Bridge
 1949: Corejada
 1950: Gamble in Gold
 1951: Constantia
 1952: Royal Duchy
 1953: Crimson
 1954: Our Betters
 1955: La Fresnes
 1956: Pharsalia
 1957: Liberal Lady
 1958: Fortune's Darling
 1959: Queensberry

See also
 Horse racing in Great Britain
 List of British flat horse races

References
 Paris-Turf: 
 Racing Post:
 galopp-sieger.de – Lowther Stakes.
 ifhaonline.org – International Federation of Horseracing Authorities – Lowther Stakes (2019).
 pedigreequery.com – Lowther Stakes – York.
 

Flat races in Great Britain
York Racecourse
Flat horse races for two-year-old fillies
Recurring sporting events established in 1946
Breeders' Cup Challenge series
1946 establishments in England